Bombogor can refer to:
 Bömbögör, Bayankhongor, a district in Bayankhongor Province, Mongolia
 Bombogor (chief), (died 1640) a chief of the Evenks